Derebucak is a town and district of Konya Province in the Mediterranean region of Turkey. According to 2000 census, population of the district is 19,053 of which 5,072 live in the town of Derebucak.

Derebucak Çamlık Caves are a group of 13 caves in Çamlık town registered as a natural monument.

References

External links

External links
 District governor's official website 
 District municipality's official website 

Populated places in Konya Province
Derebucak District
Districts of Konya Province